Eamonn Darcy (8 March 1933 – 7 November 2022) was an Irish footballer who played as a goalkeeper.

Career
Nicknamed "Sheila", Darcy began at junior club Johnville F.C. before joining Shelbourne F.C. and then Dundalk F.C. After two years at Oldham Athletic he came home to join Shamrock Rovers in 1956, making his debut on 7 October, and played in the club's first four European Champion Clubs' Cup games.

Darcy earned one B cap for the Republic of Ireland national team in 1960.

Darcy played in Rovers' trip to the US and Canada in the summer of 1961. He left for Drumcondra F.C. in December 1962. Darcy saved a penalty in the League of Ireland's win over the English League XI in October 1963.

In August 1967, Darcy had his testimonial. He signed for Shels again in May 1968.

Darcy managed the Republic of Ireland women's national team in the 1980s and Newbridge Town F.C. in the 1990s.

Personal life and death
Darcy died on 7 November 2022, at the age of 89.

Honours
Shamrock Rovers
 League of Ireland: 1956–57, 1958–59
 League of Ireland Shield: 1957–58, 1962–63
 Leinster Senior Cup: 1956, 1957, 1958
 Dublin City Cup: 1956–57, 1957–58, 1959–60
 Top Four Cup: 1957–58

Drumcondra
 League of Ireland: 1964–65

References

Sources 
 The Hoops by Paul Doolan and Robert Goggins

1933 births
2022 deaths
Association football goalkeepers
Republic of Ireland association footballers
Republic of Ireland B international footballers
Shamrock Rovers F.C. players
Shelbourne F.C. players
Dundalk F.C. players
Oldham Athletic A.F.C. players
English Football League players
Drumcondra F.C. players
League of Ireland players
League of Ireland XI players
Republic of Ireland women's national football team managers
Republic of Ireland football managers